Manoj Pandey may refer to:

 Manoj Kumar Pandey (1975–1999), officer of the Indian Army
 Manoj Pandey (actor) (born 1967), Indian actor and voice actor